The Egginer is a mountain of the Swiss Pennine Alps, overlooking Saas-Fee in the canton of Valais.

References

External links
 Egginer on Hikr
 Egginer on Summitpost

Mountains of the Alps
Alpine three-thousanders
Mountains of Valais
Mountains of Switzerland